NanoSail-D2 was a small satellite built by NASA's Marshall Space Flight Center and Ames Research Center to study the deployment of a solar sail in space.

It was planned to be deployed from the FASTSAT satellite around 3 December 2010, two weeks after launch. The satellite did not eject at that time, but on 17 January 2011, it ejected on its own and deployed its sail three days later on 20 January 2011. The beacon signal began transmitting after ejection and was first received on the afternoon of 19 January 2011.

Chronology 
NanoSail-D2 was originally built as a ground spare for the NanoSail-D satellite, which was launched aboard a Falcon 1 in 2008, and was subsequently lost when the launch vehicle malfunctioned during stage separation. Over the next two years improvements were made to the spare, and the satellite was incorporated into the FASTSAT mission.

NanoSail-D2 was launched aboard a Minotaur IV / HAPS launch vehicle, inside the FASTSAT satellite. FASTSAT was a secondary payload on the launch, with the primary payload being STPSat-2. The launch also carried RAX, O/OREOS, FalconSat-5, and the two FASTRAC satellites; Sara-Lily and Emma. The Minotaur was launched from Launch Pad 1 of the Kodiak Launch Complex at 01:25 UTC on 20 November 2010. Orbital Sciences Corporation conducted the launch under a contract with the United States Air Force.
 
NanoSail-D2 was expected to separate from FASTSAT on 6 December 2010, but the bay door did not open, preventing its ejection. Successful ejection was confirmed on 19 January 2011; it is unclear what caused the ejection mechanism to fail and then ultimately release at this later date. NASA requested amateur radio operators listen for the beacon signal from NanoSail-D. They did and picked up the 1-second beacon transmissions which were transmitted every 10 seconds. While battery power was soon exhausted, as predicted by the principal investigator, Dean Alhorn, the spacecraft was expected to sail on in low-Earth orbit for 70 to 120 days, depending on atmospheric conditions, before it burnt up, and to become easier to view after the atmosphere stabilized its tumbling.

To generate publicity and to encourage observations while the sail was still in orbit, NASA and Spaceweather.com announced a photography competition with a grand prize of US$500 to capture images of the solar sail in orbit.

On 17 September 2011, the solar sail re-entered the atmosphere after 240 days in orbit, though this was only announced on 29 November 2011.

See also 

 NanoSail-D, the failed predecessor to NanoSail-D2, launched in August 2008
 IKAROS, a Japanese solar sail, launched in May 2010
 LightSail 2, a controlled solar sail CubeSat launched in July 2019
 CubeSail (UltraSail), a sail technology demonstration launched in 2018
 Near-Earth Asteroid Scout, a solar sail CubeSat launched in 2022
 CubeSail, a planned cubesat sail mission
 Sunjammer, a solar sail that was cancelled before launch in 2014

References

External links 
 NASA NanoSail-D Mission page
 NanoSail-D dashboard
 Twitter page
 An index of images by astrophotographer Ralf Vandebergh created with a telescope mounted camera.
 information about NanoSail-D2 on eoportal.org

Spacecraft launched in 2010
Solar sail spacecraft
CubeSats
Spacecraft launched by Minotaur rockets
Spacecraft which reentered in 2011